

Gmina Bodzentyn is an urban-rural gmina (administrative district) in Kielce County, Świętokrzyskie Voivodeship, in south-central Poland.

It is known for a unique version of kapusta that includes sheep intestine and kohlrabi.
The gmina contains part of the protected area called Sieradowice Landscape Park.

Villages
Apart from the town of Bodzentyn, Gmina Bodzentyn contains the villages and settlements of Celiny, Dąbrowa Dolna, Dąbrowa Górna, Hucisko, Kamieniec, Kamienna Góra, Leśna, Orzechówka, Podgórze, Podkonarze, Podmielowiec, Psary-Kąty, Psary-Podłazy, Psary-Stara Wieś, Ściegnia, Siekierno, Sieradowice Drugie, Sieradowice Pierwsze, Śniadka Druga, Śniadka Parcele, Śniadka Pierwsza, Śniadka Trzecia, Święta Katarzyna, Wiącka, Wilków, Wola Szczygiełkowa, Wzdół Rządowy and Wzdół-Kolonia.

Neighbouring gminas
Gmina Bodzentyn is bordered by the gminas of Bieliny, Górno, Łączna, Masłów, Nowa Słupia, Pawłów, Suchedniów and Wąchock.

References
 Polish official population figures 2006

Bodzentyn
Kielce County